"Tightrope" is the opening track to A New World Record by Electric Light Orchestra (ELO).

Recorded in 1976 at  Musicland, Munich, West Germany, the song features a dramatic orchestral opening before transforming into an upbeat rock song. Although never released as a single, the song was a fan favorite and was performed live at every ELO concert including the Zoom tour in 2001. It had been remastered in 2000 and included on the box set Flashback It is the opening number of set four on the 2016 Alone in the Universe tour. When inducting ELO into the Rock and Hall of Fame, Dhani Harrison made several references to the song, saying "Someone had actually thrown me down a line, and my life was changed."

Sampled
Samples from "Tightrope" have been featured in various forms in many rap songs, by artists including Army of the Pharaohs, The Game, Chief Kamachi, I-20, and various European rappers like French Rap Group Fonky Family (the track 'Dans la legende' from the Art de Rue album), Sinik ('Réglement extérieur'), Dutch group Lost Rebels ('Revolutie' from the album Revolutie), Croatian rapgroup Tram 11 ( 'Jedno' from the album Vrućina gradskog asfalta), Italian and Dutch synth group Koto ('Mind Machine' from the album From the Dawn of Time), the German rapper Sido ('Goldjunge' from the album Ich), as well as the Albanian rapper Noizy ('Ak' from the album Most Wanted).

References

1976 songs
Electric Light Orchestra songs
Song recordings produced by Jeff Lynne
Songs written by Jeff Lynne